Rex William Orr (19 June 1923 – 1 September 2011) was a New Zealand rugby union player. A fullback, Orr represented Otago and Auckland at a provincial level. He was a member of the New Zealand national side, the All Blacks, in 1949, playing a single international match against Australia.

References

1923 births
2011 deaths
People from Gore, New Zealand
New Zealand rugby union players
New Zealand international rugby union players
Otago rugby union players
Auckland rugby union players
Rugby union fullbacks
People educated at Gore High School
Rugby union players from Southland, New Zealand